Lembruch is a municipality in the district of Diepholz, in Lower Saxony, Germany. A touristic locality during the summer season, it borders the Dümmer, a lake known in the region for birdwatching and watersports such as wind-surfing.

References

Diepholz (district)